Detroit Media Partnership, L.P. manages the business operations - including production, advertising and circulation - for the two leading Detroit newspapers: The Detroit News and Detroit Free Press. Detroit Media Partnership also handles Detroit-area circulation for The New York Times, USA Today, Investor's Business Daily, and Financial Times.

Its headquarters are in Downtown Detroit.

History
Detroit Media Partnership is the result of a 100-year joint operating agreement between the Detroit Free Press and The Detroit News.  In 1987, the newspapers entered into the agreement, combining business operations while maintaining separate editorial staffs. The two papers also began to publish joint Saturday and Sunday editions, though the editorial content of each remained separate. At the time, the Detroit Free Press was the 10th highest circulation paper in the United States, and the combined Detroit News and Free Press was the country's fourth-largest Sunday paper.

Originally called the Detroit Newspaper Agency, the company was reorganized and renamed after Gannett sold The Detroit News to MediaNews Group, and purchased the Detroit Free Press from Knight Ridder. Each paper now publishes separate editions Monday through Saturday, with the Detroit Free Press publishing the Sunday newspaper.

In February 2014, the Partnership announced all three units would occupy six floors in both the old and new sections of the former Detroit Branch Building of the Federal Reserve Bank of Chicago.  The partnership anticipated completing the move before September and expected to place a sign on the exterior.

In 2016 the company was rebranded as Michigan.com

References

External links
Official website of DMP
The Detroit News
The Detroit Free Press

Companies based in Detroit
Newspaper companies of the United States
Gannett
MediaNews Group
Publishing companies established in 1987
Detroit Free Press
Joint ventures
The Detroit News